Veronica diosmifolia, synonym Hebe diosmifolia, is a plant of the family Plantaginaceae, endemic to New Zealand.

References

diosmifolia
Flora of New Zealand